The Iskandar Johor Open was a golf tournament held in Malaysia and part of the Asian Tour. It was first held in 2007 when it was played at the Royal Johor Country Club in Johor Bahru.

The 2008 purse was US$500,000. In 2009, Johor Open's purse was doubled to a size of US$1 million. The prize fund in 2010 was US$1.25 million, the joint richest event sanctioned solely by the Asian Tour, alongside the Hero Honda Indian Open, and 8th richest event of the Asian Tour. The 2011 Johor Open was added to the European Tour and the purse increased to US$2 million. In 2012, the Johor Open was no longer a European Tour event but the prize money remained at US$2 million. The tournament was discontinued after 2012.

The Championship was supported by the Johor state government and the Iskandar Region Development Authority (IRDA).

Winners

Notes

External links
 Coverage on the Asian Tour's official site
 Coverage on the European Tour's official site

Former Asian Tour events
Former European Tour events
Golf tournaments in Malaysia
Sport in Johor
Recurring sporting events established in 2007
Recurring sporting events disestablished in 2012
2007 establishments in Malaysia
2012 disestablishments in Malaysia